Sap Branch is a stream in Fleming County, Kentucky, in the United States. It is a tributary of the Licking River.

A variant name is Battle Run. The original name of Battle Run commemorates a skirmish in 1791 between Indians and white settlers near the stream.

See also
List of rivers of Kentucky

References

Rivers of Fleming County, Kentucky
Rivers of Kentucky
Tributaries of the Ohio River
Licking River (Kentucky)